This is a list of seasons completed by the Utah Utes men's college basketball team.

Seasons

 

  Majerus coached six games (4–2) before undergoing heart surgery. Assistant Joe Cravens (12–12, 7–9) was the acting coach the rest of the season.
  Majerus coached first game (1–0) before taking a personal leave of absence. Assistant Dick Hunsaker finished the season.
  Majerus coached the first 20 games (15–5, 3–2) of the season before retiring from Utah. Assistant Kerry Rupp finished out the year (9–4, 6–3).

References

 
Utah Utes
Utah Utes basketball